José Luis Damiani (born 21 November 1956) is a retired professional tennis player from Uruguay.  He turned pro in 1977 and retired in 1983.  Damiani won two ATP Tour doubles titles in his career, and reached career-high rankings of No. 32 in singles and No. 49 in doubles.  He is the former captain of the Uruguay Davis Cup team. He is rumored to play in the next Davis Cup tie against Perú in March 2016.

Career finals

Doubles (2 wins, 1 loss)

External links
 
 
 

1956 births
Living people
Uruguayan people of Italian descent
Uruguayan male tennis players
Sportspeople from Montevideo